Angele or Angèle may also refer to:
Angele (deme), a deme of ancient Attica, in Greece.
Angèle, a given name
Angèle (singer), a Belgian singer
Angèle (film), a 1934 drama written, directed and produced by Marcel Pagnol

See also
Sainte-Angèle, Quebec (disambiguation)
Angel (disambiguation)